Events in the year 1933 in Portugal.

Incumbents
President: Óscar Carmona
Prime Minister: António de Oliveira Salazar

Events
Constitutional referendum

Arts and entertainment
José Malhoa Museum established

Sports
C.D. Tondela founded
S.C. Freamunde founded
Futebol Benfica founded
S.C. Mineiro Aljustrelense founded

Births

Deaths

16 January – Artur Ivens Ferraz, military officer and politician (born 1870)

References

 
1930s in Portugal
Portugal
Years of the 20th century in Portugal
Portugal